The following is a list of soul blues musicians.

Johnny Adams
Peggy Scott-Adams
Kip Anderson
James Armstrong
Reneé Austin
L.V. Banks
Jo Jo Benson
Buster Benton
Bobby Bland
Blues Boy Willie
Ronnie Baker Brooks
Michael Burks
Jimmy Burns
Barbara Carr
Annika Chambers
Otis Clay
Willie Clayton
Gary B.B. Coleman
Michael Coleman
Shemekia Copeland
Larry Davis
Paul deLay
Johnny Drummer
Carol Fran
Frank Frost
Earl Gaines
Sandra Hall
Larry Hamilton
Ted Hawkins
Z. Z. Hill
The Holmes Brothers
Ellis Hooks
Etta James
L.V. Johnson
Andrew "Jr. Boy" Jones
Johnny "Yard Dog" Jones
Tutu Jones
Albert King
B.B. King
Little Jimmy King
Eddie Kirkland
Denise LaSalle
Benny Latimore
Calvin Leavy
Bonnie Lee
Frankie Lee
Trudy Lynn
J.J. Malone
Jimmy McCracklin
Little Milton
Willie Mitchell
Sugar Ray Norcia
Darrell Nulisch
Jay Owens
Junior Parker
Ann Peebles
Johnny Rawls
A.C. Reed
Tad Robinson
Bobby Rush
Oliver Sain
Marvin Sease
Preston Shannon
Drink Small
Alexis P. Suter
Johnnie Taylor
Koko Taylor
Little Johnny Taylor
Ike Turner
Robert Ward
Walter "Wolfman" Washington
Lavelle White
Lynn White
Lee "Shot" Williams
Big Daddy Wilson
Zora Young

References

See also
List of gospel blues musicians

External links
AllMusic

Soul